Arthur Hughes  (July 1884 – 1970) was a Welsh international footballer. He was part of the Wales national football team, playing one match on 23  February 1907 against Ireland. At club level, he played for Chirk.

See also
 List of Wales international footballers (alphabetical)

References

1884 births
1970 deaths
Welsh footballers
Wales international footballers
Chirk AAA F.C. players
Place of birth missing
Date of death missing

Association footballers not categorized by position